Count Toussaint-Guillaume Picquet de la Motte, also known as La Motte-Picquet (born 1 November 1720 in Rennes; died 10 June 1791 in Brest) was a French Navy officer and admiral. Over a career spanning 50 years, he served under Louis XV and Louis XVI and took part in 34 campaigns. He fought in the Seven Years' War and in the Naval battles of the American Revolutionary War, earning the ranks of Commandeur in the Order of Saint Louis in 1780, and of Grand Cross in 1784. He died during the French Revolution.

Biography

Early life 
La Motte-Picquet joined the Gardes de la Marine in Brest on 11 July 1735, then aged 15. Two years later, he served on the frigate Vénus in a campaign against the Barbary corsairs of Salé. On 1 January 1743, he rose to sous-brigadier des gardes de la marine, and then to aide d'artillerie on 10 December, after serving in two campaigns in the English Channel and off Ireland on Mercure, under Dubois de La Motte, in a squadron under Roquefeuil.

In January 1745, during the War of the Austrian Succession, after having conducted nine campaigns off Morocco, in the Baltic Sea and in the Caribbean, he transferred on the frigate Renommée, under Captain Guy François de Kersaint. On 6 February 1745, Renommée departed Brest to ferry despatches to Louisbourg, then blockaded by the British. Taking advantage of the fog and the ice that hindered the British cruisers, the frigate managed to anchor at Baie des Castors, where she still had to fight off several smaller British ships.

On 16 June 1746, on her third trip from Canada, Renommée met a British squadron under Admiral George Anson. In the ensuing battle, Kersaint was gravely wounded and La Motte-Picquet took command, managing to escape to Port-Louis. La Motte-Picquet himself had his cheek cut away by a cannonball.

On 24 February 1784, La Motte-Picquet departed Brest as first officer on the 24-gun frigate Cumberland, under Captain Mézédern, bound for Ile de France and Ile Bourbon. After calling A Coruña, Cumberland encountered a British 36-gun frigate, leading to an inconclusive battle where she lost 25 killed or wounded. After a 122-day travel, Cumberland reached Bourbon, and then Ile de France. From there, she departed for a cruise off India on 20 October 1748.

Peace being restored in October 1748 with the Treaty of Aix-la-Chapelle, La Motte-Picquet cruised in the Caribbean, in the Atlantic and the Indian Ocean. In 1754, he rose to the rank of Lieutenant de Vaisseau.

Seven Years' War 
In 1755, La Motte-Picquet earned his first command. In October 1756, he was made a Knight in the Order of Saint-Louis.

In 1757, La Motte-Picquet was part of the staff of the 74-gun Diadème, under Captain Rosily-Méros, part of the squadron under Dubois de La Motte tasked to challenge the British off Québec. In 1758, he fought off Fort de Portzic in Brest Roads, and had to report his actions before the Secretary of State for the Navy Arnouville.

In 1760, he was on convoy escort duty between Brest and Rochefort. In 1762, he was promoted to captain and appointed to Diadème.

After the Peace of Paris in 1763, La Motte-Picquet served in squadrons under Admiral d'Orvilliers and Duchaffaut. In September 1763, he was given command of the 32-gun frigate Malicieuse to undertake a 6-month cruise off Canada.

In the next years, he conducted several raids against the Barbary corsairs of Salé. In 1772, commanding the 16-gun corvette Cerf-Volant, he distinguished himself in a training squadron under Orvilliers.

In 1776, he was given command of the 64-gun ship of the line Solitaire, with Louis Philippe II, Duke of Orléans as a notable participant.

American Revolutionary War 

In June 1777, Lamotte-Picquet commanded the 74-gun Robuste. On 14 February 1778, he  fired a nine-gun salute for USS Ranger, marking the first time a foreign warship recognised the US flag.

In 1778, as a Squadron Commander, he took part in the Battle of Ouessant on the Saint-Esprit, and then cruised the English seas. During one month, he captured thirteen ships.

During the American Revolutionary War, Picquet de la Motte distinguished himself as a member of Admiral d'Estaing's squadron in Martinique, during the Battle of Grenada, and the Siege of Savannah.

On 18 December 1779, he attacked a British squadron under the command of Admiral Hyde Parker that was attempting to blockade a French convoy off Martinique; in the ensuing Battle of Martinique, La Motte-Picquet so impressed Hyde Parker that he sent him a letter of congratulation:

In 1781, as commander of a nine-vessel squadron that included three frigates, Picquet de la Motte intercepted the fleet of Admiral Rodney en route from St. Eustatius which the British had captured in February 1781. Picquet de la Motte captured 26 British ships, along with Rodney's plunder in the amount of 5 million sterling. Soon afterwards he was promoted to Lieutenant General of the Naval Armies.

Death 
After fifty-two years of service and severe attacks of gout in his later years, La Motte-Piquet died on 11 June 1791 in Brest, aged 70. He was buried in the local graveyard.

Legacy

Five ships of the French Navy have been named La Motte-Picquet in his honour, the most recent being the F70-Type frigate Lamotte-Picquet, still in service as of 2020.

A street in the 7th arrondissement of Paris, l'Avenue de la Motte-Picquet, is named after him. The Paris metro station La Motte-Picquet – Grenelle is located on the avenue, on the border of the 7th and 15th arrondissements of Paris.

See also 

 French ship La Motte-Picquet
 Franco-American alliance

Notes and References

References

Notes

Bibliography 
 Louis Édouard Chevalier, Histoire de la marine française pendant la guerre de l'indépendance américaine, précédée d'une étude sur la marine militaire de la France et sur ses institutions depuis le commencement du XVIIe siècle jusqu'à l'année 1877, Paris, Hachette, 1877 
 Amédée Gréhan, La France maritime, t. 3, Paris, chez Postel, 1837 
 
 Jean Meyer et Martine Acerra, Histoire de la marine française : des origines à nos jours, Rennes, Ouest-France, 1994, 427 p. [détail de l’édition] (notice BnF no FRBNF35734655)
 Étienne Taillemite et M. Dupont, Les Guerres navales françaises du Moyen Âge à la guerre du Golfe, collection Kronos, 1996.
 
 Pierre-Bruno-Jean de La Monneraye et Philippe Bonnichon, Souvenirs de 1760 à 1791, Librairie Droz, 1998, 505 p. 
 Guy Le Moing, Les 600 plus grandes batailles navales de l'Histoire, Marines Éditions, mai 2011, 620 p.
  p. 280-283
 Louis-Mayeul Chaudon, Dictionnaire historique, critique et bibliographique, contenant les vies des hommes illustres, célèbres ou fameux, de tous les pays et de tous les siècles, suivi d'un dictionnaire abrégé des mythologies, et d'un tableau chronologique des événements les plus remarquables qui ont eu lieu depuis le commencement du monde jusqu'à nos jours, vol. 20, Paris, Ménard et Desenne, 1822
 Antoine-Vincent Arnault, Éphémérides universelles, ou, Tableau religieux,politique, littéraire, scientifique et anecdotique, présentant un extrait des annales de toutes les nations et de tous les siècles, 1834, p. 218
  p. 127
 Tugdual de Langlais, Jean Peltier Dudoyer, l'armateur préféré de Beaumarchais, de Nantes à l'Isle de France, Éd. Coiffard, 2015, 340 p.. Ce livre a une reproduction de l'accord entre Jonathan Williams et le commandant du Lion, futur Dean. AD 44, C art 1030.
  p. 361 et suiv.

1720 births
1791 deaths
French Navy admirals
French people of the American Revolution
Counts of La Motte